The EuroLeague Basketball Legend Award is an award that is given by the Euroleague Basketball Company, the organizer of the EuroLeague, which is the top-tier level professional basketball competition in Europe. It is awarded only to a very distinct and small group of the greatest EuroLeague star players, head coaches, and executives who are honored from time to time for their outstanding playing, coaching, and front-office careers in the league. To which, the EuroLeague's organizing body, the Euroleague Basketball Company, sees fit to officially designate them as "EuroLeague Legends". 

EuroLeague Legends may be officially designated during or after their playing, coaching, or administrative careers. All players, head coaches, and executives who have been active in the EuroLeague are eligible for the EuroLeague Legend designation. Currently, the EuroLeague Legend Award has only been given to six players, one head coach, and one team executive.

Award winners

Players

Major EuroLeague accomplishments

Head coaches

Executives

* The 2000–01 season was a transition year, with the best European basketball teams split into two different major leagues: The SuproLeague, held by FIBA, and the Euroleague, held by Euroleague Basketball Company. The 2001 FIBA SuproLeague title is recognized by the EuroLeague.

References

External links 
Euroleague.net Official Website 

Basketball museums and halls of fame
Legend Award